Pinkham may refer to:

People
 Bryce Pinkham (born 1982), American stage and television actor
 Charles Pinkham (politician) (1853–1938), English politician
 Charles H. Pinkham (1844–1920), American soldier
 Cyprian Pinkham (1844–1928), Anglican Bishop of Saskatchewan
 Daniel Pinkham (1923–2006), American composer, organist, and harpsichordist
 Dora Pinkham (1891–1941), American politician in Maine
 Ed Pinkham (American football) (born 1953), American college football coach
 Ed Pinkham (baseball) (1846–1906), American baseball player
 Louis Pinkham (1888–1919), American football player and coach
 Lucius E. Pinkham (1850–1922), fourth Territorial Governor of Hawaii
 Lydia Pinkham (1819–1883), American patent medicine manufacturer and businesswoman
 Mary Ellen Pinkham (contemporary), American humor columnist and author
 Natalie Pinkham (born 1977), British television presenter
 Sam Pinkham (contemporary), English broadcaster
 Albert Pinkham Ryder (1847–1917), American painter

Places
 Pinkham Notch, mountain pass in Coös County, New Hampshire
 Pinkham's Grant, New Hampshire, township in Coös County, New Hampshire
 Bishop Pinkham Junior High School, a public junior high school in Calgary, Alberta
 19419 Pinkham, a minor planet discovered in 1998

Structures
 Daniel Pinkham House, in Portsmouth, New Hampshire
 Lydia Pinkham House, in  Lynn, Massachusetts
 Pinkham House, in Quincy, Massachusetts
 Richard Pinkham House, in Medford, Massachusetts

See also
 Pincham